Altar Alfonse Greene (November 9, 1954 – February 18, 2014) was an outfielder who played in 29 games for the Detroit Tigers in 1979.

External links

1954 births
2014 deaths
African-American baseball players
Baseball players from Detroit
Detroit Tigers players
Acereros de Monclova players
Azules de Coatzacoalcos players
Saraperos de Saltillo players
Major League Baseball outfielders
20th-century African-American sportspeople
21st-century African-American people
Evansville Triplets players
Lakeland Tigers players
Montgomery Rebels players
Springfield Redbirds players
American expatriate baseball players in Mexico